Hatfield is an unincorporated census-designated place, in the town of Komensky, Jackson County, Wisconsin, United States. As of the 2010 census, its population is 141.

Geography
It is located on the shores of Lake Arbutus, an impoundment of the Black River. The dam forming the impoundment releases water back into the river channel and a diversion channel for a hydroelectric powerhouse.

Tourism
Hatfield is a tourist community that claims a population of 5000 in the summer and 50 in the winter. Two county campgrounds are located in the community, and the Levis/Trow trail system is two miles to the north.

History
Hatfield was founded by Norbert St. Germaine in 1836. The city was supported in the 19th century by the logging and lumber industry, as the Black River was a primary avenue for delivery of logs from central Wisconsin to the Mississippi River valley. The Green Bay and Western Railroad arrived in 1872.

Notable people
 Hatfield was the birthplace of Mitchell Red Cloud, Jr. of the Ho Chunk Nation, who was awarded the Medal of Honor posthumously for his actions in the Korean War.  A monument in his honor is located at the Black Hawk Powwow Grounds south of Hatfield.

Notes

Census-designated places in Wisconsin
Census-designated places in Jackson County, Wisconsin
Logging communities in the United States